Manning is a ghost town in Angelina County, Texas in East Texas. It is located within the Lufkin, Texas micropolitan area.

History
Manning was most prosperous from 1903 to 1934. Dr. Manning was born in Monroe, Louisiana and brought in a pharmacist, physician, merchant and an industrialist to the county's development. Another sawmill powered by steam was built in Manning on Lindsey Lake near Homer in 1885. W.T. Carter and G.A. Kelley then founded the Carter-Kelley Lumber Company in 1903 and built another mill near the site of the original mill. It was here that Manning was founded. This mill used the most modern machinery of its time and cut all sizes of lumber, mostly yellow pine. It cut  of board each year and had 300 people employed. Wood was brought to this mill from Angelina, Tyler, Polk and Jasper counties. The Shreveport, Houston, and Gulf Railroad (which was also known as "Shove Hard and Grunt") built a track from Manning to Huntington to connect it to the Cotton Belt and Texas and New Orleans Railroad. The Carter-Kelley Lumber Company used scrip instead of normal currency and served as a bank for its employees, who called them "Manning checks". A post office was established at Manning in 1906, with Charles C. Gribble as the postmaster. Manning was one of Angelina County's most populous cities, with a population of 700 in 1910. It grew to over 1,000 residents by 1925, with 2/3 of them being white and 1/3 being black. Besides the post office, Manning also had a commissary, a barbershop, a movie theater, an automobile repair shop, three churches, a civic center, a drugstore, a railroad depot, and several office buildings that belonged to the lumber company. It all came to an end when the mill burned down in 1934, causing the population to plunge and the mill not to be rebuilt. Houses were demolished and sold to businessmen from Dallas. Mill employees were forced to find work elsewhere. Its population was reported as 100 in 1939 and then went down to 30 in 1945 with only one business. The community received its mail from the post office in Huntington in 1940. Manning was officially removed from the Texas Almanac's official list of cities and towns in 1947. There were only two abandoned houses, the ruins of the sawmill, and a cemetery in the 1980s. The Flournoy family held a Manning reunion each year on the first Sunday in June, which was then moved to the first weekend in May 2004.

The Gibbs-Flournoy House in the community is listed on the National Register of Historic Places.

Geography
Manning was located in the bottomlands of the Neches River in southeastern Angelina County.

Education
Manning had a school for white children with seven teachers employed and another school for black students with two teachers at its peak of prosperity. The schools closed when mill employees left the area. Today, the ghost town is located within the Huntington Independent School District.

See also
List of ghost towns in Texas

References

Geography of Angelina County, Texas
Ghost towns in East Texas